Agalega creole is a creole language influenced by French spoken in Agalega. It has been heavily influenced by both Mauritian Creole and Seychellois Creole, as well as Malagasy. The population of speakers number just under 1,000.

See also 

 Creole language
 Rodriguan creole
 Mauritian creole
 Chagossian creole

References

French-based pidgins and creoles
Mauritian Creole